Eugenio Castellucci was an Argentine professional football player.

Year of birth missing
Year of death missing
Argentine footballers
Argentine people of Italian descent
Argentine expatriate footballers
Expatriate footballers in Italy
Argentine expatriate sportspeople in Italy
Serie A players
Juventus F.C. players
Association football midfielders